Case knife can refer to:
 A large type of table knife, typically stored in a case
 Sheath knife
 The Dutch case-knife, a variety of runner bean
 W. R. Case & Sons Cutlery Co., a maker of knives